A number of steamships have been named SS Pruth:

 , captured and scuttled by the German light cruiser  on 9 October 1914.
 , wrecked in 1923.

Ship names